Hershberger Mountain Lookout is a lookout structure located near Prospect, Oregon, in the United States. It was built in 1925 and was listed on the National Register of Historic Places on December 29, 2000.

See also
 National Register of Historic Places listings in Douglas County, Oregon

References

External links
 

1925 establishments in Oregon
Buildings and structures completed in 1925
National Register of Historic Places in Douglas County, Oregon